David Hutton may refer to:

 David Hutton (footballer, born 1985), Scottish football goalkeeper
 David Hutton (footballer, born 1989), Irish football midfielder 
 David Graham Hutton (1904–1988), British economist, author and politician